Yeongsimi is Korean animated series produced by Bae Geum-taek. The story is about innocent but zany adolescent girl Young-sim's normal life. The original version was a comic book first produced in 1990, and after that it was broadcast on KBS in the same year. The popular video version has 13 episodes in total. Young-sim is a representative character of the early 1990s.

A novel version was made in 2004, followed by a musical which has been performed since 2008.

Plot

Young-sim is a fourteen-year-old girl who has a round face, round eyes and a pony tail. Her boyfriend Wang Gyeong-tae follows her incessantly. He is considered ugly and stammers when he speaks, but he deeply loves Young-sim. Young-sim treats Gyeong-tae coldly. However, Young-sim displays considerable jealousy upon discovering Gyeong-tae was with another girl. Her mean best friend and her sister Sun-sim add humor to the story.

Novel
In the novel version, Bae Geum-taek modernized the setting from 1990's Korea to that of 2004. Otherwise the plot is unchanged.

Episodes List

References 

1990s South Korean animated television series